The Fengjie Bridge is a cable-stayed bridge which crosses the Yangtze River in Fengjie, Chongqing, China. Completed in 2005, it carries 4 lanes of traffic on the S201 provincial road. The bridges main span measures  which places it among the longest cable-stayed spans in the world.

See also
List of largest cable-stayed bridges
Yangtze River bridges and tunnels

External links
http://www.highestbridges.com/wiki/index.php?title=Fengjie_Yangtze_River_Bridge

References

Bridges in Chongqing
Bridges over the Yangtze River
Cable-stayed bridges in China
Bridges completed in 2005